Theta Chi Beta was a national honor society recognizing excellence in the study of religion.  It was founded at Syracuse University.

History
Theta Chi Beta was formed in the 1914-1915 school year at Syracuse University as an honor society for students in the fields of Religious Studies and Theology.  Several chapters were formed.

The Aleph chapter (Alpha) remains active as the Theta Chi Beta chapter of Theta Alpha Kappa, a larger, national honor society for students in Religious studies.  It was allowed to keep this name in recognition of its long history and formative role in establishing its own national society.

The last remaining independent chapter of Theta Chi Beta was the Gimel chapter, (Gamma), formed in 1937 at Florida Southern College, which went dormant sometime after 2008.

Traditions
Symbols of the Fraternity include the six-pointed Star called Magen David, the Shield of David, the outline of a fish symbolic of early Christians, and the Greek word and acronym, ICHTHUS, representative of "Jesous Christos Theou Uios Soter", or "Jesus Christ God's Son Savior".

Chapter officers used Hebrew designations:
Melek (king) for president
Sar (prince) for vice-president
Sopher (scribe) for secretary/treasurer
Maskir (rememberer) for recording secretary

The emblem of the society was similar to other honor society keys, with the Hebrew letter Beth as a frame, in which was held an open book, the Bible, all rendered in gold.

Chapters
The list of chapters of Theta Chi Beta was as follows:

This list is incomplete.

References

See also
Theta Alpha Kappa

Honor societies
Student organizations established in 1915
1915 establishments in New York (state)